The Green Bay and Western Railroad Depot is located in Whitehall, Wisconsin. It was added to the National Register of Historic Places in 2006.

History
The small brick depot was built in 1914 by the Green Bay and Western Railroad with separate waiting rooms for men and women. It replaced an earlier wooden depot built in 1877 by the Green Bay and Lake Pepin Railroad. Passenger train service to Whitehall ended on April 13, 1949, when the GB&W discontinued service between Green Bay and Winona.

References

Buildings and structures in Trempealeau County, Wisconsin
Railway stations on the National Register of Historic Places in Wisconsin
Railway stations in the United States opened in 1914
National Register of Historic Places in Trempealeau County, Wisconsin
Former railway stations in Wisconsin